Fumaria flabellata is a species of plants in the family Papaveraceae.

Sources

References 

flabellata
Flora of Malta